Airth was a railway station serving Airth in the Scottish county of Falkirk.

History
The station was opened as Carnock Road in July 1852 on the Alloa Branch of the Scottish Central Railway, the branch had opened two years earlier in 1850.

Originally the station was at a level crossing, there was a single platform on a single line of railway with a siding to the south. The OS map has the station named as Carnock Station.

In 1865 the station was renamed Airth Road and it was again renamed as Airth in 1866.

One of the agreements made between the Caledonian Railway (CR) and the North British Railway prior to the Alloa Railway opening in 1885 was to double track the remainder of the Alloa Branch to accommodate the increased traffic that would result from the bridge over the Forth.

When the line was double-tracked the station was rebuilt, the road now formed an overbridge and the station was relocated to the south of the road, there were two platforms connected by a footbridge either side of a double running line, and a siding to the east, and a signal box to the south.

By 1915, a goods shed and several sidings had been added. The goods yard was able to accommodate most types of goods including live stock and was equipped with a two ton crane.

The station closed on 20 September 1954.

References

Notes

Sources

Further reading

External links
 Station on navigable O.S. map
 The Third Statistical Account - Reference to Station

Disused railway stations in Stirling (council area)
Former Caledonian Railway stations
Railway stations in Great Britain opened in 1866
Railway stations in Great Britain closed in 1954
1866 establishments in Scotland